Thollet is a commune in the Vienne department in the Nouvelle-Aquitaine region in western France.

Geography
The river Benaize forms most of the commune's southeastern border, flows through the commune, then forms part of the commune's western border.

See also
Communes of the Vienne department

References

Communes of Vienne
County of La Marche